Gymnostachyum kwangsiense is a species of plant in the family Acanthaceae. It is endemic to China.

References

Acanthaceae
Endemic flora of China
Vulnerable plants
Taxonomy articles created by Polbot
Plants described in 1979